Trashiyangtse or Tashi Yangtse is a small town in Yangtse Gewog, and the district headquarters of the Trashiyangtse District in eastern Bhutan. It lies inside the Bumdeling Wildlife Sanctuary on the eastern tri-junction of Bhutan-India-China and to the east lies Tawang in India. Nearest airport is Yongphulla Airport 130 km away.

Its population in 2005 was 2735. Located in close proximity to Chorten Kora stupa which lies to the west, a dzong was inaugurated in Trashiyangste in 1997. It contains a major art school, The School of Traditional Arts, also known as Rigne School, which is a sister school of the Zorig Chosum School of Traditional Arts in Thimphu, and teaches six forms of art; painting, pottery, wood sculpture, wood-turning, lacquer-work and embroidery.

See also 
Bhutan–India relations
Bhutan–India border
Bhutan–China border
Line of Actual Control

References

External links
 Satellite map at Maplandia.com
 Yangtse Gewog - official web page.

Populated places in Bhutan